The 2012 Survivor Series was the 26th annual Survivor Series professional wrestling pay-per-view (PPV) event produced by WWE. It took place on November 18, 2012, at Bankers Life Fieldhouse in Indianapolis, Indiana, which was the first Survivor Series held in Indiana. The event received 212,000 pay-per-view buys, down from 281,000 buys the previous year.

Seven matches were scheduled on the event's card and one match took place on the pre-show. In the main event, CM Punk defeated John Cena and Ryback to retain the WWE Championship. In other prominent matches, Eve Torres retained the Divas' Champion against Kaitlyn and Antonio Cesaro retained the United States Champion against R-Truth.

The event is notable for the onscreen main roster debut of Dean Ambrose, Roman Reigns, and Seth Rollins, who would collectively be known as The Shield.

Production

Background
Survivor Series is an annual gimmick pay-per-view (PPV), produced every November by WWE since 1987. The second longest running pay-per-view event in history (behind WWE's WrestleMania), it is one of the promotion's original four pay-per-views, along with WrestleMania, Royal Rumble, and SummerSlam, referred to as the "Big Four". The event is traditionally characterized by having Survivor Series matches, which are tag team elimination matches that typically pits teams of four or five wrestlers against each other. The 2012 event was the 26th event in the Survivor Series chronology and was scheduled to be held on November 18, 2012.

The 2012 event was originally scheduled to be held at the Consol Energy Center in Pittsburgh, Pennsylvania. However, this booking inadvertently conflicted with the National Football League's schedule for the 2012 season, which pitted the Pittsburgh Steelers against the Baltimore Ravens in a home game that same night. Despite Pittsburgh being a strong WWE market dating from the territorial days of professional wrestling, WWE decided to make no attempts to locally compete against the fanbase of the Steelers (especially since the game was against the team's archrival) and moved Survivor Series to the Bankers Life Fieldhouse in Indianapolis, Indiana, marking the first Survivor Series held in the state. WWE compensated Pittsburgh by having a double Raw and SmackDown taping in December, before giving the city a "Big Four" pay-per-view with the now-infamous 2014 Royal Rumble.

Storylines
The professional wrestling matches at Survivor Series featured professional wrestlers performing as characters in scripted events pre-determined by the hosting promotion, WWE. Storylines between the characters played out on WWE's primary television programs, Raw and SmackDown.

On the October 29, 2012 episode of Raw, a Survivor Series elimination match between a team managed by Mick Foley, and a team led by CM Punk was scheduled. Originally Punk captained the team which also included The Miz, Cody Rhodes and Damien Sandow and Alberto Del Rio, whereas Foley's team was to consist of Ryback, Kofi Kingston, Kane, Daniel Bryan and Randy Orton. The team members were involved in many feuds: Hell in a Cell, Team Rhodes Scholars (Rhodes and Sandow) had unsuccessfully challenged Team Hell No (Kane and Daniel Bryan) for the Tag Team Championship and the Miz had failed to win the Intercontinental Championship from Kingston. Del Rio had also lost to Orton at the event. However, the main feud was between the WWE Champion CM Punk and Ryback. Ryback had lost a title match at Hell in a Cell after the referee Brad Maddox low-blowed him, before a fast count to give Punk the pinfall victory. Ryback then took out his frustration on Punk and Maddox, first press-slamming Maddox out of the ring into the side of the cell, then chasing Punk to the top of the cell, where Ryback caught him and performed his finishing move, Shell Shocked. There were many changes: On the November 5 episode of Raw, The Miz quit the team due to Punk abandoning his team in an attack by Team Foley and was replaced by Wade Barrett, who Paul Heyman had recruited. Furthermore, WWE Chairman Vince McMahon questioned Vickie Guerrero's decision to place Punk in an elimination match instead of letting him defend his title, and forced Vickie Guerrero to remove Punk and Ryback from the elimination match. Dolph Ziggler replaced Punk as captain of the team, which was now renamed Team Ziggler. Ryback's replacement was to be chosen by a RAW active poll, with the choices The Miz, Santino Marella, and Zack Ryder being candidates. Rhodes was replaced by David Otunga at the event due to an injury sustained in the lead-up to the event.

Instead of competing in the Survivor Series elimination match, CM Punk was scheduled to defend his WWE Championship in a triple threat match against Ryback and John Cena, whom Punk had wrestled to a draw at Night of Champions.

Survivor Series also included a rematch from Hell in a Cell between Sheamus and Big Show for the World Heavyweight Championship.

At Night of Champions, Kaitlyn was attacked by an unknown woman moments before she was set to face off against Layla for the WWE Divas Championship, which led to Eve Torres replacing Kaitlyn and winning the title. In the weeks that followed, the evil Aksana was eventually revealed as Kaitlyn's attacker, doing so under Eve's orders. As a result, a Triple Threat Match took place at Hell In A Cell, with Eve defeating Layla and Kaitlyn to retain the title. On the November 12 edition of Raw, Kaitlyn defeated Layla to earn a Divas Championship match at Survivor Series.

Justin Gabriel and Tyson Kidd were initially scheduled to face 3MB in the pre-show available free on YouTube, but were replaced with Team Co-Bro (Santino Marella and Zack Ryder) due to being placed in a different match at the event.

Event

Pre-show
On the pre-show 3MB (Heath Slater and Jinder Mahal with Drew McIntyre at ringside) faced Team CoBro (Santino Marella and Zack Ryder). Though Ryder was able to execute the Broski Boot and Rough Ryder on Slater, he missed the tag made by Mahal who pinned Ryder resulting in a victory for 3MB.

Preliminary matches
The main show opened with an unannounced Survivor Series elimination match between the team of Brodus Clay, Tyson Kidd, Justin Gabriel, Rey Mysterio and Sin Cara and the team of Tensai, Primo & Epico and The Prime Time Players (Darren Young and Titus O'Neil). Clay was eliminated by Tensai after a Gomennasai. Tensai was eliminated by Gabriel with a Crucifix Pin. O'Neil was eliminated by Kidd with a Roll Up. Epico was eliminated by Kidd after submitting to the Sharpshooter. Primo was eliminated by Mysterio with La Magistral. Young was eliminated by Mysterio after a 619 followed by a Diving Splash, leaving Kidd, Gabriel, Mysterio and Sin Cara as the survivors.

Next, Eve defended the Divas Championship against Kaitlyn. Eve pinned Kaitlyn after  the Heart Breaker to win the match.

In the third match Antonio Cesaro defended the United States Championship against R-Truth. Cesaro pinned R-Truth after a Neutralizer to win the match.

Main event matches
In the first of three main event matches, World Heavyweight Champion Big Show was challenged by former champion, Sheamus. The match ended when Big Show intentionally used the referee as a shield, causing Sheamus to inadvertently performed a Brogue Kick on the referee. With Sheamus distracted and attending to the official, Big Show performed the Knockout Punch on Sheamus, after which another referee counted the fall and awarded Big Show the victory. The referee reversed the decision and disqualified Big Show, who nevertheless retained the title. After the match, Big Show argued with the referee John Cone, before Sheamus assaulted Big Show with a chair, and setting up a rematch at next month's TLC pay-per-view.

The fifth match was a Survivor Series match between Team Foley (Randy Orton, The Miz, Kane, Daniel Bryan, and Kofi Kingston, with Mick Foley at ringside) and Team Ziggler (Dolph Ziggler, Wade Barrett, Alberto Del Rio, Damien Sandow and David Otunga). Sandow was eliminated by Kane after a Chokeslam. Kane was eliminated by Ziggler after a Zig Zag. Otunga was eliminated by Bryan after submitting to the No Lock. Kingston was eliminated by Barrett after a Bull Hammer. Bryan was eliminated by Del Rio after submitting to the Cross Armbreaker. Barrett was eliminated by The Miz after a Skull Crushing Finale. The Miz was eliminated by Del Rio after a Step Up Enziguri on the Top Rope. Del Rio was eliminated by Orton after an RKO. After Orton kicked out of a Zig Zag, Orton attempted to perform a Punt Kick on Ziggler but Ziggler performed a Superkick on Orton to eliminate him, leaving Ziggler as the sole survivor.

The last match of the night was a triple threat match for the WWE Championship between reigning champion CM Punk and challengers Ryback and John Cena. The match came to an end when the debuting trio of Seth Rollins, Dean Ambrose and Roman Reigns - later known as The Shield - approached the ring from the crowd and triple-powerbombed Ryback through the broadcast table, allowing Punk to retain the title by pinning Cena, who had received a Shell Shock from Ryback. With Punk's win he became only the seventh wrestler in history to hold the WWE Championship consecutively for one full year.

Results

Survivor Series elimination matches

References

External links
Official Survivor Series website

2012 in Indiana
2012
Events in Indianapolis
Professional wrestling in Indianapolis
2012 WWE pay-per-view events
November 2012 events in the United States